Teenage Mailbag was an Australian television series which aired in 1957 to 1958 on Melbourne station HSV-7. Information on this series is scarce. According to a 2008 article in The Age, the format consisted of Ernie Sigley, Gaynor Bunning and Heather Horwood singing requested songs in a 15-minute slot, and later expanded to an hour. The one-hour version became the series The Teenage Show (1958-1960?). At one point, the series aired at 7:15PM, preceded by another 15-minute series titled Take That and followed by an American program (The Adventures of Rin Tin Tin).

It should not be confused with an unrelated 1960s series by the same name which aired on TCN-9 in Sydney (see Teenage Mailbag).

See also
Teen Time
TV Disc Jockey

References

External links

Seven Network original programming
1957 Australian television series debuts
1958 Australian television series endings
Black-and-white Australian television shows
English-language television shows
Pop music television series
Australian music television series
Australian live television series